Santiago Vergini (born 3 August 1988) is an Argentine professional footballer who plays as a centre-back.

Club career

Early career
Born in Máximo Paz, Constitución Department, Santa Fe, Vergini was a Vélez Sársfield youth graduate, but only appeared with the reserves in the lower leagues. In June 2009 he signed a two-year deal with Paraguayan side Club Olimpia, and made his professional debut on 13 September, in a 0–2 home loss against Club Libertad.

Vergini scored his first goal on 7 November, netting the second in a 2–1 home win against Sportivo Luqueño. He finished his first professional year with 12 appearances and one goal, as his side finished fifth.

On 1 September 2010 Vergini was loaned to Lega Pro Prima Divisione team Verona, in a one-year deal. He appeared in 15 matches, scoring a goal against Bassano Virtus.

Newell's Old Boys
On 26 July 2011 Vergini signed for Newell's Old Boys. He made his debut for the club on 2 September, playing the full 90 minutes in a 0–0 home draw against Colón de Santa Fe.

An undisputed starter for La Lepra, Vergini appeared in 32 matches and scored three goals in 2011–12 (against Olimpo, Banfield and Unión Santa Fe). He was again ever-present in the following campaign, as his side reached the semi-finals of 2013 Copa Libertadores.

Estudiantes
On 1 August 2013, after being linked to a possible move to FC Barcelona, Vergini joined Estudiantes de La Plata. He appeared in 17 matches, scoring one goal (against Godoy Cruz on 16 November).

Sunderland
On 20 January 2014, Vergini secured a loan move to Premier League side Sunderland for the remainder of the 2013–14 season. He made his league debut on 8 February, replacing Fabio Borini in the first half against Hull City after the dismissal of regular centre-back Wes Brown.

Vergini made his first start on 22 February away to Arsenal. He was also an unused substitute as Sunderland lost the 2014 Football League Cup Final 3–1 to Manchester City at the Wembley Stadium on 2 March.

After several games playing in central defence, manager Gus Poyet slotted Vergini into the right back position due to injuries. He helped Sunderland avoid relegation to finish 14th in the Premier League.

On 7 August 2014, he re-signed for Sunderland on a season-long loan for the 2014–15 campaign, with the deal becoming a permanent two-year contract after the Black Cats avoided relegation.

In October 2014, Vergini scored an own goal during a Premier League game against Southampton, volleying from the edge of the penalty area past goalkeeper Vito Mannone. Luke Perry of the BBC described it as "one of the Premier League's most spectacular own goals". It was the first goal in an 8–0 away defeat for the Black Cats.

Getafe (loan)
On 16 July 2015 Vergini was loaned to Spanish La Liga side Getafe CF in a season-long deal with a view to a permanent transfer.

Boca Juniors
In June 2016, Vergini returned to his home country and signed with Boca Juniors, for an undisclosed fee.

Bursaspor 
On 28 August 2018 he has signed a two-year deal with Bursaspor.

San Lorenzo
Ahead of the 2019–20 season, Vergini returned to Argentina and signed a 3-year contract with San Lorenzo de Almagro.

International career
Vergini earned his first cap for Argentina in a 1–2 Superclásico de las Américas loss at Brazil on 20 September 2012, after coming on as a 73rd-minute substitute for Lisandro López. He returned to the team on 14 October 2014, playing the entirety of a 7–0 friendly away win against Hong Kong and again in November 2014, starting in a 2–1 success over Croatia at the Boleyn Ground.

Career statistics

Club

International

Honours
Newell's Old Boys
 Primera División: Torneo Final 2013, Torneo Inicial 2013 Runner-up

Sunderland
 Football League Cup 2013–14 Runner-up

References

External links

1988 births
Living people
People from Constitución Department
Argentine footballers
Association football defenders
Paraguayan Primera División players
Club Olimpia footballers
Serie C players
Hellas Verona F.C. players
Argentine Primera División players
Newell's Old Boys footballers
Estudiantes de La Plata footballers
Boca Juniors footballers
Premier League players
Sunderland A.F.C. players
La Liga players
Süper Lig players
Getafe CF footballers
Bursaspor footballers
San Lorenzo de Almagro footballers
Atlético Tucumán footballers
Argentina international footballers
Argentine expatriate footballers
Expatriate footballers in Paraguay
Expatriate footballers in Italy
Expatriate footballers in England
Expatriate footballers in Spain
Expatriate footballers in Turkey
Argentine expatriate sportspeople in Paraguay
Argentine expatriate sportspeople in Italy
Argentine expatriate sportspeople in England
Argentine expatriate sportspeople in Spain
Argentine expatriate sportspeople in Turkey
Sportspeople from Santa Fe Province